Digital Insight was a provider of online banking software to banks and credit unions. It also designed FinanceWorks, a product that allowed customers to manage their finances. In 2014, the company was acquired by and folded into NCR Corporation.

History
The company was founded in July 1995 by Paul Fiore and Daniel Jacoby.

In February 1996, the company raised $1.1 million in seed money from the founders' former employer, XP Systems, and received its first client, Community Credit Union, of Plano, Texas.

The company had $85,000 in revenue in its first six months. Revenue jumped to $1.5 million in 1996 and to $4.1 million in 1997, and to $8.2 million in 1998.

In April 1997, the company raised $6 million from Menlo Ventures.

In September 1997, the company acquired RJE Internet Services, a developer of bank websites.

In March 1998, the company raised $3 million from Menlo Ventures and $5 million from HarbourVest Partners.

In October 1998, John Dorman became CEO of the company.

On October 1, 1999, during the dot-com bubble, the company became a public company via an initial public offering. After pricing at $15 per share, the stock rose to $32 per share on its first day of trading, up 114%.

In February 2000, the company acquired nFront.

In April 2000, the company acquired 1View Network.

In July 2000, the company acquired AnyTime Access for $140 million.

In February 2002, the company acquired Virtual FinancialServices for $51 million.

In October 2003, the company acquired Magnet Communications for $33.5 million in cash and 1.45 million shares of Digital Insight common stock.

Also in October 2003, Jeffrey Stiefler was named CEO of the company.

On February 7, 2007, Intuit acquired the company for $1.35 billion.

In October 2008, the company introduced the consumer version of FinanceWorks and in December 2008, the small business version was launched.

In September 2013, John O’Malley was named CEO of the company.

On August 1, 2013 Thoma Bravo acquired Intuit Financial Services for $1.025 billion.

On January 10, 2014, NCR Corporation acquired the company for $1.65 billion.

In 2015, the company integrated EyeVerify's eye vein recognition technology, called Eyeprint ID, into its mobile banking platforms.

References

Software companies established in 1995
Banking software companies
1995 establishments in California
1999 initial public offerings
2007 mergers and acquisitions
2014 mergers and acquisitions
Companies based in Redwood City, California
Defunct software companies of the United States
Dot-com bubble
NCR Corporation